Rattini is a very large, diverse tribe of muroid rodents in the subfamily Murinae. They are found throughout Asia and Australasia, with a few species ranging into Europe and northern Africa. The most well-known members of this group are the true rats (genus Rattus), several species of which have been introduced worldwide.

Taxonomy 
They are thought to be the second-most basal member of the Murinae despite their high modern diversity, with only the Phloeomyini being more basal than them.

The genus Micromys was previously classified in a polyphyletic division also containing Hapalomys, Chiropodomys, and Vandeleuria, but phylogenetic evidence supports it forming a sister group to the rest of the Rattini. It has been debated over whether it represents its own tribe (Micromyini) or a basal member of the Rattini, but the American Society of Mammalogists classifies it within the Rattini based on a 2019 study.

Distribution 
They are mostly found throughout Asia, primarily in the tropics and subtropics, but with a few genera such as Rattus, Micromys (if considered a part of Rattini) and Nesokia ranging north to temperate regions or west to arid regions. In addition, many species in the genus Rattus are found throughout New Guinea and Australia, making them the only native rodents to the region outside of the Hydromyini. Only one species (Micromys minutus, if included) ranges throughout Europe, and another (Nesokia indica) ranges into northern Egypt. Several Rattus species have also been introduced worldwide, and in some cases have become invasive species that have led to the extinction of many animals and plants.

Within Asia, the Rattini reach their highest diversity in the tropics of Southeast Asia, especially in the Philippines and the Indonesian island of Sulawesi.

Species 
Species in the tribe include:

 Berylmys divisionGenus Berylmys - white-toothed rats
 Small white-toothed rat, Berylmys berdmorei
 Bower's white-toothed rat, Berylmys bowersi
 Kenneth's white-toothed rat, Berylmys mackenziei
 Manipur white-toothed rat, Berylmys manipulusBunomys divisionGenus Bullimus
 Bagobo rat, Bullimus bagobus
 Camiguin forest rat, Bullimus gamay
 Large Luzon forest rat, Bullimus luzonicus
 Genus Bunomys
 Andrew's hill rat, Bunomys andrewsi
 Yellow-haired hill rat, Bunomys chrysocomus
 Heavenly hill rat, Bunomys coelestis
 Fraternal hill rat, Bunomys fratrorum
 Karoko hill rat, Bunomys karokophilus
 Inland hill rat, Bunomys penitus
 Long-headed hill rat, Bunomys prolatus
 Tana Toraja hill rat, Bunomys torajae
Genus Eropeplus (Sulawesian soft-furred rat)
 Sulawesi soft-furred rat, Eropeplus canus
Genus Halmaheramys
 Spiny Boki Mekot rat, Halmaheramys bokimekot
 Wallace's large spiny rat, Halmaheramys wallacei
Genus Komodomys
 Komodo rat, Komodomys rintjanus
Genus Lenomys (trefoil-toothed rat)
 Trefoil-toothed giant rat, Lenomys meyeri
Genus Papagomys - Flores giant rats
 Flores giant rat, Papagomys armandvillei
 Verhoeven's giant tree rat, Papagomys theodorverhoeveni †
 Genus Paruromys (Sulawesian giant rat)
 Sulawesi giant rat, Paruromys dominator
 Genus Paulamys
 Flores long-nosed rat, Paulamys naso
Undescribed genus
Timor rat, "Rattus timorensis"
Genus Sundamys - giant Sunda rats
 Annandale's rat, Sundamys annandalei
 Mountain giant Sunda rat, Sundamys infraluteus
 Bartels's rat, Sundamys maxi
 Müller's giant Sunda rat, Sundamys muelleri
 Genus Taeromys
 Salokko rat, Taeromys arcuatus
 Lovely-haired rat, Taeromys callitrichus
 Celebes rat, Taeromys celebensis
 Sulawesi montane rat, Taeromys hamatus
 Small-eared rat, Taeromys microbullatus
 Sulawesi forest rat, Taeromys punicans
 Tondano rat, Taeromys taeraeDacnomys division Genus Chiromyscus (Fea's tree rat)
 Fea's tree rat, Chiromyscus chiropus
 Genus Dacnomys (Large-toothed giant rat)
 Millard's rat, Dacnomys millardi
 Genus Lenothrix (Grey Tree Rat)
 Gray tree rat, Lenothrix canus
 Genus Leopoldamys - long-tailed giant rats
 Sundaic mountain leopoldamys or Sundaic Mountain long-tailed giant rat, Leopoldamys ciliatus
 Edwards's long-tailed giant rat, Leopoldamys edwardsi
 Millet's long-tailed giant rat, Leopoldamys milleti
 Neill's long-tailed giant rat, Leopoldamys neilli
 Long-tailed giant rat, Leopoldamys sabanus
 Mentawai long-tailed giant rat, Leopoldamys siporanus
 Genus Margaretamys - margareta rats
 Beccari's margareta rat, Margaretamys beccarii
 Christine's margareta rat, Margaretamys christinae
 Elegant margareta rat, Margaretamys elegans
 Little margareta rat, Margaretamys parvus
 Genus Niviventer - white-bellied rats
 Anderson's white-bellied rat, Niviventer andersoni
 Brahma white-bellied rat, Niviventer brahma
 Cameron Highlands white-bellied rat, Niviventer cameroni
 Chinese white-bellied rat, Niviventer confucianus
 Coxing's white-bellied rat, Niviventer coninga
 Dark-tailed tree rat, Niviventer cremoriventer
 Oldfield white-bellied rat, Niviventer culturatus
 Smoke-bellied rat, Niviventer eha
 Large white-bellied rat, Niviventer excelsior
 Montane Sumatran white-bellied rat, Niviventer fraternus
 Chestnut white-bellied rat, Niviventer fulvescens
 Limestone rat, Niviventer hinpoon
 Lang Bian white-bellied rat, Niviventer langbianis
 Narrow-tailed white-bellied rat, Niviventer lepturus
 Hainan white-bellied rat, Niviventer lotipes (formerly in N. tenaster)
 White-bellied rat, Niviventer niviventer
 Long-tailed mountain rat, Niviventer rapit
 Tenasserim white-bellied rat, Niviventer tenaster
 Genus Saxatilomys
 Paulina’s limestone rat, Saxatilomys paulinae
 Genus Tonkinomys
 Daovantien’s limestone rat, Tonkinomys daovantieni
 Echiothrix division Genus Echiothrix
 Central Sulawesi echiothrix, Echiothrix centrosa
 Northern Sulawesi echiothrix, Echiothrix leucura
Genus Gracilimus
Sulawesi root rat, Gracilimus radix
Genus Hyorhinomys
 Hog-nosed shrew rat, Hyorhinomys stuempkei
 Genus Melasmothrix (Lesser Sulawesian Shrew Rat)
 Sulawesian shrew rat, Melasmothrix naso
 Genus Paucidentomys
 Edented Sulawesi rat, Paucidentomys vermidax
 Genus Sommeromys
 Sommer's Sulawesi rat, Sommeromys macrorhinos
 Genus Tateomys - greater Sulawesian shrew rats
 Long-tailed shrew rat, Tateomys macrocercus
 Tate's shrew rat, Tateomys rhinogradoides
 Genus Waiomys
 Sulawesi water rat, Waiomys mamasaeMaxomys division
 Genus Crunomys - Philippine and Sulawesian shrew rats
 Celebes shrew-rat, Crunomys celebensis
 Northern Luzon shrew-rat, Crunomys fallax
 Mindanao shrew-rat, Crunomys melanius
 Katanglad shrew-mouse, Crunomys suncoides
 Genus Maxomys (rajah rats)
 Mountain spiny rat, Maxomys alticola
 Maxomys baeodon
 Bartels's spiny rat, Maxomys bartelsii
 Dollman's spiny rat, Maxomys dollmani
 Hellwald's spiny rat, Maxomys hellwaldii
 Sumatran spiny rat, Maxomys hylomyoides
 Malayan mountain spiny rat, Maxomys inas
 Fat-nosed spiny rat, Maxomys inflatus
 Mo's spiny rat, Maxomys moi
 Musschenbroek's spiny rat, Maxomys musschenbroekii
 Chestnut-bellied spiny rat, Maxomys ochraceiventer
 Pagai spiny rat, Maxomys pagensis
 Palawan spiny rat, Maxomys panglima
 Rajah spiny rat, Maxomys rajah
 Red spiny rat, Maxomys surifer
 Watts's spiny rat, Maxomys wattsi
 Whitehead's spiny rat, Maxomys whiteheadi
 Micromys division (alternately considered a distinct tribe, Micromyini)
 Genus Micromys
 Indochinese harvest mouse, Micromys erythrotis
Eurasian harvest mouse, Micromys minutus
 Rattus division
 Genus Abditomys
 Luzon broad-toothed rat, Abditomys latidens
 Genus Baletemys
 Kampalili shrew-mouse, Baletemys kampalili
 Genus Bandicota - bandicoot rats
 Lesser bandicoot rat, Bandicota bengalensis
 Greater bandicoot rat, Bandicota indica
 Savile's bandicoot rat, Bandicota savilei
 Genus Diplothrix
 Ryukyu long-tailed giant rat, Diplothrix legatus
 Genus Kadarsanomys
 Sody's tree rat, Kadarsanomys sodyi
 Genus Limnomys
 Gray-bellied mountain rat, Limnomys bryophilus
 Mindanao mountain rat, Limnomys sibuanus
 Genus Nesokia (Short-tailed Bandicoot Rat)
 Bunn's short-tailed bandicoot rat, Nesokia bunnii
 Short-tailed bandicoot rat, Nesokia indica
 Genus Nesoromys
 Ceram rat, Nesoromys ceramicus
 Genus Palawanomys (Palawan rat)
 Palawan soft-furred mountain rat, Palawanomys furvus
 Genus Rattus - typical rats
 incertae sedis
 Enggano rat, Rattus enganus
 Philippine forest rat, Rattus everetti
 Polynesian rat, Rattus exulans
 Hainald's rat, Rattus hainaldi
 Hoogerwerf's rat, Rattus hoogerwerfi
 Korinch's rat, Rattus korinchi
 † Maclear's rat, Rattus macleari
 Nillu rat, Rattus montanus
 Molaccan prehensile-tailed rat, Rattus morotaiensis
 † Bulldog rat, Rattus nativitatis
 Kerala rat, Rattus ranjiniae
 New Ireland forest rat, Rattus sanila
 Andaman rat, Rattus stoicus
 R. norvegicus group
 Himalayan field rat, Rattus nitidus
 Brown rat or Norway rat, Rattus norvegicus
 Turkestan rat, Rattus pyctoris
 R. rattus group
 Sunburned rat, Rattus adustus
 Sikkim rat, Rattus andamanensis
 Ricefield rat, Rattus argentiventer
 Summit rat, Rattus baluensis
 Aceh rat, Rattus blangorum
 Nonsense rat, Rattus burrus
 Hoffmann's rat, Rattus hoffmanni
 Koopman's rat, Rattus koopmani
 Lesser ricefield rat, Rattus losea
 Mentawai rat, Rattus lugens
 Mindoro black rat, Rattus mindorensis
 Little soft-furred rat, Rattus mollicomulus
 Osgood's rat, Rattus osgoodi
 Palm rat, Rattus palmarum
 Black rat, Rattus rattus
Little Indochinese field rat, Rattus sakeratensis
 Sahyadris forest rat, Rattus satarae
 Simalur rat, Rattus simalurensis
 Tanezumi rat, Rattus tanezumi
 Tawitawi forest rat, Rattus tawitawiensis
 Malayan field rat, Rattus tiomanicus
 R. xanthurus group
 Bonthain rat, Rattus bontanus; obs. Rattus foramineus
Lore Lindu xanthurus rat, Rattus facetus
 Opossum rat, Rattus marmosurus
 Peleng rat, Rattus pelurus
 Southeastern xanthurus rat, Rattus salocco
 Yellow-tailed rat, Rattus xanthurus
 R. leucopus group (New Guinean group)
 Vogelkop mountain rat, Rattus arfakiensis
 Western New Guinea mountain rat, Rattus arrogans
Manus Island spiny rat, Rattus detentus
 Sula rat, Rattus elaphinus
 Spiny Ceram rat, Rattus feliceus
 Giluwe rat, Rattus giluwensis
 Japen rat, Rattus jobiensis
 Cape York rat, Rattus leucopus
 Eastern rat, Rattus mordax
Gag Island rat, Rattus nikenii
 Moss-forest rat, Rattus niobe
 New Guinean rat, Rattus novaeguineae
 Arianus's rat, Rattus omichlodes
 Pocock’s highland rat, Rattus pococki
 Large New Guinea spiny rat, Rattus praetor
 Glacier rat, Rattus richardsoni
 Stein's rat, Rattus steini
 Van Deusen's rat, Rattus vandeuseni
 Slender rat, Rattus verecundus
 R. fuscipes group (Australian group)
 Dusky rat, Rattus colletti
 Bush rat, Rattus fuscipes
 Australian swamp rat, Rattus lutreolus
 Dusky field rat, Rattus sordidus
 Pale field rat, Rattus tunneyi
 Long-haired rat, Rattus villosissimus
 Genus Tarsomys
 Long-footed rat, Tarsomys apoensis
 Spiny long-footed rat, Tarsomys echinatus
 Genus Tryphomys (Mearn's Luzon Rat)
 Luzon short-nosed rat, Tryphomys adustus
Srilankamys division
Genus Srilankamys (Ceylonese rats)
 Ohiya rat, Srilankamys ohiensis
Unknown division
Genus Anonymomys (Mindoro rat)
 Mindoro climbing rat, Anonymomys mindorensis

References 

Old World rats and mice
Mammal tribes
Taxa named by Gilbert Thomas Burnett